Scooby-Doo! Mystery Adventures is a 3-disc compilation box set of educational computer games based on the Scooby-Doo franchise, and developed by The Learning Company.

Contents
The set includes Scooby-Doo: Showdown in Ghost Town, Scooby-Doo: Phantom of the Knight, and  Scooby-Doo: Jinx at the Sphinx.

Reception
According to PC Data, North American retail sales of Showdown in Ghost Town reached 93,766 units during 2001 alone, while Phantom of the Knight sold 81,154 and Jinx at the Sphinx 62,514 in the same period.  In the United States alone, Phantom of the Knight sold 290,000 copies and earned $5.9 million by August 2006. At that time, Edge ranked it as the country's 67th-best-selling computer game released since January 2000. The series as a whole sold 1.4 million units across the same time frame, which led the magazine to call Scooby-Doo! Mystery Adventures "one of the healthiest franchises" in computer games.

In the United States, the computer versions of Jinx at the Sphinx, Showdown in Ghost Town, Mystery of the Fun Park Phantom and The Glowing Bug Man all sold between 100,000 and 290,000 units by August 2006.

References

External links
Scooby-Doo: Showdown in Ghost Town 
Scooby-Doo: Phantom of the Knight 
Scooby-Doo: Jinx at the Sphinx 

2000 video games
Detective video games
Acclaim Entertainment games
Classic Mac OS games
Point-and-click adventure games
Video games based on Scooby-Doo
Video game compilations
Windows games
The Learning Company games
Cartoon Network video games
Video games developed in the United States